PGP-RTS is a major record label based in Belgrade, Serbia. It is a successor of PGP-RTB which was established in 1959 in Belgrade, then capital of Socialist Republic of Serbia and Socialist Federal Republic of Yugoslavia.

After the breakup of Yugoslavia, in 1993, the company changed its name to PGP-RTS, which is the music production branch of the Radio Television of Serbia.

Artists
PGP-RTB is notable for signing numerous eminent Serbian pop, rock and folk acts. Some of the artist currently signed to PGP-RTS, or have been so in the past, include:

See also
PGP-RTB
List of record labels

References

External links
PGP-RTS Official site

Serbian record labels
Yugoslav music
Serbian rock music
Radio Television of Serbia